Academia.edu is a for-profit open repository of academic articles free to read by visitors. Uploading and downloading is restricted to registered users. Additional features are accessible only as a paid subscription. Since 2016 various social networking utilities have been added.

The site was registered in the .edu top-level domain in 1999 when that domain was not limited to educational institutions. It is operated as for-profit company under the name Academia Inc. Since the site's launch in 2008, the number of users has grown exponentially, reaching about 10 million daily visits in early 2022. At that time the numbers of registered users is 180 million and 40 million papers are available on the site.

History

Academia.edu was founded by Richard Price.

On its filings with the Securities and Exchange Commission, the company uses the legal name Academia Inc.

Months after its acquisition of Academia.edu competitor Mendeley, Elsevier sent thousands of takedown notices to Academia.edu, a practice that has ceased since then, following widespread complaint by academics, according to Academia.edu founder and chief executive Richard Price.

In 2022 the company announced plans to launch ten “open access” journals "to swiftly review and publish their work, in a fresh disruption to the sector".

Competitors

Critics mention several alternatives for free access publications for people who want to make their work freely available. Many universities and educational consortia have their own institutional repositories, including the Big Ten Academic Alliance. Zenodo (funded by The OpenAIRE Consortium) and Humanities Commons both work to keep humanities scholarship online without monetizing it. Academia.edu's competitors include ResearchGate, Google Scholar and Mendeley. In 2016 Academia.edu reportedly had more registered users than ResearchGate (about 34 million versus 11 million) and higher web traffic, but ResearchGate had substantially more active usage by researchers. In 2020, the traffic ranks had reversed, with ResearchGate ranked in the top 150–200 websites globally according to Alexa Internet, whereas Academia.edu was positioned in the 200–300 range.

Unpaywall, which collects data about open access versions of academic publications and provides easy access to them, is considered a competitor to Academia.edu for the users who prefer more legally sound green open access hosts.

Criticism 

Academia.edu is not a university or institution for higher learning and so under current standards it would not qualify for the ".edu" top-level domain. However, since the domain name "Academia.edu" was registered in 1999, before the regulations required .edu domain names to be held solely by accredited post-secondary institutions in the USA, it is allowed to remain active and operational. All .edu domain names registered before 2001 were grandfathered in, even if not an accredited USA post-secondary institution.

According to the University of Oklahoma libraries, when interacting with Academia.edu, users should keep in mind that "you are not the customer," but rather "you are the product that these services seek to monetize and/or "offer up" to advertisers," that "you might be breaking the law," even if you are uploading your own work," and finally that "there are privacy implications," because a commercial site does not follow professional standards and "may share information about you".

A critic, Kathleen Fitzpatrick, the director of scholarly communication at the Modern Language Association, said she found the use of the ".edu" domain name by Academia.edu to be "extremely problematic", since it might mislead users into thinking the site is part of an accredited educational institution rather than a for-profit company.

Academia.edu claims it supports the open science or open access movements and, in particular, instant distribution of research, and a peer-review system that occurs alongside distribution, instead of before it. Accordingly, the company stated its opposition to the proposed (since withdrawn) 2011 U.S. Research Works Act, which would have prevented open-access mandates in the U.S.

However, in the view of critic Peter Suber, Academia.edu is not an open access repository and is not recommended as a way to pursue green open access. Peter Suber instead invites researchers to use field-specific repositories or general-purpose repositories like Zenodo.

In early 2016, some users reported having received e-mails from Academia.edu where they were asked if they would be interested in paying a fee to have their papers recommended by the website's editors. This led some users to start a campaign encouraging users to cancel their Academia.edu accounts.

Other criticisms include the fact that Academia.edu uses a vendor lock-in model: "It's up to Academia.edu to decide what you can and can't do with the information you've given them, and they're not likely to make it easy for alternative methods to access". This is in reference to the fact that, although papers can be read by non-users, a free account is needed in order to download papers: "you need to be logged in to do most of the useful things on the site (even as a casual reader)".

In December 2016, Academia.edu announced new premium features that includes data analytics on work and the professional rank of the viewers, which have also received criticism.

As of 2022, Academia.edu collects potential publications by scientists based on their names. If people have common names or if there are multiple scientists with the same name, the users get numerous so-called "mentions", and are asked to identify which publications are actually theirs and which are not. Doing so, however, requires a monthly or annually paid premium account. Without paying, scientists are not able to check which "mentions" are correctly or incorrectly assigned to their accounts. Keeping their account up-to-date and faultless therefore requires a paid account.

References

External links 

 

Internet properties established in 2008
American social networking websites
Professional networks
Social media companies of the United States
Companies based in San Francisco
Privately held companies based in California
Scholarly communication
Aggregation-based digital libraries